The 1984 San Diego Padres season was the 16th season in franchise history. San Diego won the National League (NL) championship and advanced to the World Series, which they lost to the Detroit Tigers four games to one. The Padres were led by manager Dick Williams and third-year player Tony Gwynn, who won the NL batting title and finished third in voting for the NL Most Valuable Player Award.

In their first 15 seasons, the Padres had an overall won–lost record of 995–1372 for a .420 winning percentage, and finished with a winning record just once (1978). They had never finished higher than fourth in the NL West division, and eight times they had finished in last place. However, they were coming off consecutive 81–81 seasons in Williams' two years as San Diego's manager. They won the NL West in 1984 with a 92–70 record, and set a then-franchise record in attendance, drawing nearly two million fans (1,983,904). They defeated the Chicago Cubs in the National League Championship Series (NLCS), three games to two, becoming the first NL team to win the pennant after being down 2–0. Steve Garvey was named the NLCS Most Valuable Player.

Offseason 
 October 21, 1983: Sandy Alomar Jr. was signed by the Padres as an amateur free agent.
 December 6, 1983: Joe Pittman and a player to be named later were traded by the Padres to the San Francisco Giants for Champ Summers. The Padres completed the deal by sending Tommy Francis (minors) to the Giants on December 7.
 December 7: Gary Lucas was traded by the Padres to the Montreal Expos as part of a three-team trade. The Expos sent Al Newman to the Padres, and the Chicago Cubs sent Carmelo Martínez, Craig Lefferts, and Fritzie Connally to the Padres. The Expos traded Scott Sanderson to the Cubs.
 January 6, 1984: Rich Gossage was signed as a free agent by the Padres.
 January 14: Owner Ray Kroc dies. Ownership passes to his wife, Joan B. Kroc.
 January 17: Rodney McCray was drafted by the Padres in the 9th round of the 1984 amateur draft.
 March 25: Second baseman Juan Bonilla waived.
 March 30: Dennis Rasmussen and a player to be named later were traded by the Padres to the New York Yankees for Graig Nettles. The Padres completed the deal by sending Darin Cloninger (minors) to the Yankees on April 26.

Regular season 
After spending $6 million to acquire free-agent first baseman Steve Garvey in 1983, the Padres signed free-agent reliever Goose Gossage to a five-year contract for $6.25 million in January 1984. The deal made Gossage the highest-salaried pitcher in baseball at the time. Manager Dick Williams, who had asked General Manager Jack McKeon to obtain a strikeout-type reliever, declared that the acquisition made San Diego a playoff contender. Eight days after signing Gossage, Padres owner Ray Kroc died at the age of 81. The season was dedicated in his memory with the team wearing his initials, "RAK" on their jersey's left sleeve during the entire season. Ownership of the team passed to his wife, Joan Kroc.

In February, All-Star catcher Terry Kennedy underwent arthroscopic surgery on his left knee after being bothered by continuous inflammation since the middle of 1983. During spring training, Alan Wiggins was named the team's new second baseman over incumbent Juan Bonilla, who was subsequently waived. In a gamble to generate offense, Wiggins had been moved from the outfield to make room in left field for Carmelo Martínez, who was moved from first base after being acquired in the offseason from the Chicago Cubs. The Padres were hoping to bolster their starting outfield, which produced just 23 homers in 1983. The rookie Martinez and center fielder Kevin McReynolds, whose 140 at-bats during the prior season disqualified him from being considered a rookie in 1984, were hyped by the media as the M&M Boys, alluding to the Yankees' 1960s power-hitting duo of Mickey Mantle and Roger Maris. The two Padre outfielders along with Garvey, Nettles, and Kennedy supplied San Diego with five regulars who had the potential to hit at least 20 home runs. Third-year right fielder Tony Gwynn entered the season with a .302 lifetime batting average, the highest on the club. Gwynn, McReynolds, and Martinez formed the youngest outfield in the majors. Shortstop Garry Templeton was relieved of pain from a left knee that had bother him for years, and was expected to anchor the infield, especially with Wiggins moving to second base. Templeton was also projected to bat leadoff for the Padres, but he was dropped to No. 8 in the order after he took a spike to his right knee toward the end of spring training. Three days before the season opener, 39-year-old third baseman Graig Nettles, a San Diego native, approved a trade from the New York Yankees to the Padres. A left-handed batter who had hit 333 career home runs, he was open to platooning with incumbent Luis Salazar, although Nettles was expected to get the majority of playing time given the larger number of right-handed starting pitchers in the majors. Heading into the season, Williams' biggest concern was their pitching. The starters largely relied on finesse and off-speed pitches, and none of them had ever won more than 16 games.

The Padres won their first four games of the season, and were 9–2 before leaving on their first road trip. They were 18–11 before losing seven in a row, their longest losing streak of the season. The streak was snapped on May 17, when Wiggins tied an NL record with five stolen bases, and the club swiped a team record of seven in a 5–4 home win over Montreal. They were tied for first in the West at the end of May, and were  games up by the end of June. After moving back into first place on June 9, they did not relinquish the lead the rest of the season. San Diego played at a steady pace, never falling below .500, while their longest winning streak was only six. San Diego clinched the division on September 20, when they beat San Francisco 5–4 behind a three-run homer by pitcher Tim Lollar, and Houston lost to Los Angeles 6–2 three hours later. The Padres finished the season with a 92–70 record, winning the NL West division by 12 games. It was just the second winning season in the franchise's history. The future Hall-of-Famer Gwynn batted .351 to capture the first of his eight NL batting titles, while also gathering 213 hits to shatter the Padres record of 194 established by Gene Richards in 1980. Eric Show (15–9, 3.40 ERA) was the only starting pitcher with 15 wins, though the four main starters all recorded at least 11. The acquisition of Gossage, who finished the season 10–6 with a 2.90 ERA and 25 saves, was a strong factor in San Diego's 34–24 record in one-run games.

The team relied on small ball and moving runners over. With the exception of Gwynn, who finished third in balloting for the NL Most Valuable Player Award, no Padre enjoyed an outstanding season individually. McReynolds led the team with a .465 slugging percentage and was tied with Nettles for the team lead in home runs with 20. Only two other Padres exceeded 10 homers. Garvey led the club with 86 RBIs, the only Padre with more than 75. Coming off his thumb injury from 1983, he hit only eight home runs and drew just 24 walks, but had 175 hits and did not commit an error. Wiggins' move to second base proved successful, as he exhibited excellent range with his quickness in spite of his 32 fielding errors. Offensively as the leadoff hitter, he batted .258 and drew 75 walks for an on-base percentage of .342, while setting club records by stealing 70 bases and scoring 106 runs. Benefitting from the higher number of fastballs opposing pitchers threw in response to Wiggins' speed, Gwynn batted above .400 when his speedy teammate was on base. According to Williams, Wiggins "was absolutely the most valuable player in the National League in 1984." No longer a .300 hitter like in his earlier days with St. Louis, Templeton enjoyed his most successful season since 1981. Hitting eighth in the lineup, he did not receive many pitches to hit. He batted .258 with 24 extra-base hits and six game-winning RBI, and was praised by Williams for his defense. Both Templeton and Gwynn were honored by The Sporting News with Silver Slugger Awards, and Martinez (.249, 13 HR, 68 walks) was named to the Topps All-Star Rookie Team. Martinez however, hit only three homers in the second half, and just one after July 18, after hitting 10 in the first half. Troubled by his knees, Kennedy slumped to .240 while his RBIs fell to 57 from 98 a year earlier. Nettles hit .222, which was 29 points below his career average, and most of his homers came in two hot streaks. However, his averages of .252/.355/.469 against right-handed pitching were near his career norms.

San Diego's pitching staff was last in the league in strikeouts per nine innings, and were among the team leaders in most home runs allowed and walks allowed. Still, they were adept at forcing fly balls and had a low ground ball/fly ball ratio. In addition to Show, the starting rotation included fellow 28-year-old Mark Thurmond (14–8, 2.97), as well as veterans Ed Whitson (14–8, 3.24) and Lollar (11–13, 3.91). Andy Hawkins (8–9, 4.68) and Dave Dravecky (9–8, 2.93) split time as the fifth starter. In the bullpen, Gossage and Craig Lefferts (2.13 ERA and 10 saves) each appeared in 62 games and logged over 100 innings apiece. Unlike modern closers, Gossage often entered games in the seventh or eighth innings, with Lefferts filling in as the stopper when Gossage needed a game off after working successive long stints. Dravecky also recorded eight saves. At age 33, Gossage experienced a decline in his fastball, and did not record a save after August 25.

Williams led the team with a tough, no-nonsense approach. He cited the advantage of having the experience of veterans Garvey, Nettles, and Gossage on the team. Prior to joining the Padres, Garvey and Nettles had advanced to the World Series four times, while Gossage had participated in two. Throughout the season, they stressed the value of consistency and an even temperament to youngsters like Gwynn, McReynolds, and Martinez, who were among the 11 players on the team with less than four years of major league experience. Gossage and Nettles, in particular, would stay after games and talk baseball and have a beer with the youngsters. Additionally, Templeton befriended Wiggins, helping his transition from the outfield to second base.

Brawl with the Atlanta Braves 

The Padres' regular season is most remembered for an August 12 Sunday afternoon game at Atlanta–Fulton County Stadium against the Atlanta Braves. The Braves were expected to be contenders for the division title, but were a disappointing 9 1/2 games out of first at gametime. The start of the game was delayed 2 hours by rain.

Braves starting pitcher Pascual Pérez hit Alan Wiggins with the very first pitch of the game, which seemed to put the Padres into retaliatory mode. The Braves went up 2–0 in the bottom of the first on a Claudell Washington homer.

When Perez came to bat in the bottom of the 2nd, Padres starter Ed Whitson threw at him as he squared to bunt. Perez responded by wielding his bat and starting toward Whitson, but home plate umpire Steve Rippley restrained him as both benches began to clear. Rippley issued a warning to both teams without any fighting ensuing. The Braves scored another run in the inning to go up 3–0.

In the bottom of the fourth, Whitson threw three straight inside fastballs at Perez, and Rippley ejected both Whitson and manager Dick Williams. Greg Booker replaced Whitson and gave up two more runs before facing Perez in the bottom of the sixth. Then, Booker also threw at Perez and Rippley proceeded to throw both him and acting manager Ozzie Virgil out of the game. In the top of the seventh, Graig Nettles hit a solo homer off Perez, which would incite later activity.

In the bottom of the eighth, Craig Lefferts threw at Perez and Rippley ejected both him and second acting manager Jack Krol, leaving only Harry Dunlop to manage the rest of the way. This time, both the Braves' and Padres' dugouts cleared and the brawl was on. First base umpire John McSherry and Padres first baseman Steve Garvey attempted to head off the onslaught, but both were caught in the middle as both teams exchanged punches. The brawl went on for 10 minutes before reserve infielder Champ Summers stormed towards Perez, who had retreated to the Braves' dugout. Bob Horner (who was actually on the disabled list with an injured wrist, but dressed in uniform once the initial brawl started) met Summers at the front of the dugout and he and the Braves' Rick Camp wrestled him to the ground along with a fan who leaped on top of Summers from the stands. Another fan doused Summers with a drink. On the side, the Padres' Bobby Brown and the Braves' Gerald Perry engaged in a fight of their own. Summers, Brown, Camp, and Perry were all ejected.

Finally, in the top of the ninth, Braves' reliever Donnie Moore hit Nettles with his second pitch when he came to bat, sparking yet another fight. Nettles was wrestled to the ground by Rick Mahler and Steve Bedrosian as he came after Moore. Moore was then attacked by Goose Gossage as he retreated to the dugout and Gossage was wrestled to the ground by manager Joe Torre and other Braves players. Nettles then went after Moore again and was finally restrained, but Gerald Perry, who had already been ejected, went after Tim Flannery. Moore, Nettles, Gossage, and Torre were ejected at that point. Several other players besides Perry from both teams who were ejected after the previous fight risked suspensions by returning to the field to participate. Fans in the seats behind the Padres' dugout began to taunt the Padres, including Ed Whitson, who had been ejected back in the fourth inning. The fans began to pelt and shower the Padre players with drinks, prompting Kurt Bevacqua to climb to the top of the dugout with a bat. At that moment, a fan leaped onto the field and tried to steal a batting helmet before being tackled by players and detained by security. Finally, Rippley, McSherry, and the umpiring crew ordered players and coaches for both sides not otherwise engaged in the game out of their dugouts and into their clubhouses for the remainder of the game. All fans who participated in the taunting and brawls were detained and arrested.

Once the game finally resumed, Gene Garber pitched the remainder for the Braves with Joe Pignatano acting for Torre. The Padres scored two in the ninth, but no more as the Braves won 5–3. Fines and suspensions were issued four days later on August 16 to Williams ($10,000, ten days) and Summers, Brown, Torre ($1,000), Perry ($700), Bedrosian ($600) and Mahler ($700) who each received three-day suspensions. Virgil, Krol, Whitson, Booker, Lefferts, Bevacqua, Flannery, Nettles and Gossage for the Padres (all undisclosed) and Moore ($350) and Pérez ($300) for the Braves were all fined but not suspended.

Opening Day starters 
 Steve Garvey
 Tony Gwynn
 Terry Kennedy
 Carmelo Martínez
 Kevin McReynolds
 Graig Nettles
 Eric Show
 Garry Templeton
 Alan Wiggins

Season standings

Record vs. opponents

Notable transactions 
 July 20, 1984: Al Newman was traded by the San Diego Padres to the Montreal Expos for Greg Harris.

Roster

Game log 

|- style="text-align:center;"
| Legend:       = Win       = Loss       = PostponementBold = Padres team member

Postseason game log 

|- style="text-align:center;"
| Legend:       = Win       = Loss       = PostponementBold = Padres team member

Player stats

Batting

Starters by position 
Note: Pos = Position; G = Games played; AB = At bats; H = Hits; Avg. = Batting average; HR = Home runs; RBI = Runs batted in

Other batters 
Note: G = Games played; AB = At bats; H = Hits; Avg. = Batting average; HR = Home runs; RBI = Runs batted in

Pitching

Starting pitchers 
Note: G = Games pitched; IP = Innings pitched; W = Wins; L = Losses; ERA = Earned run average; SO = Strikeouts

 Other pitchers Note: G = Games pitched; IP = Innings pitched; W = Wins; L = Losses; ERA = Earned run average; SO = Strikeouts Relief pitchers Note: G = Games pitched; W = Wins; L = Losses; SV = Saves; ERA = Earned run average; SO = Strikeouts NLCS 

In the 1984 NLCS, the Padres faced the NL East champion Chicago Cubs, who were making their first post-season appearance since 1945 and featured NL Most Valuable Player Ryne Sandberg and Cy Young Award winner Rick Sutcliffe. The Cubs would win the first two games at Wrigley Field, but the Padres swept the final three games at then-Jack Murphy Stadium (the highlight arguably being Steve Garvey's dramatic, game-winning home run off of Lee Smith in Game 4) to win the 1984 National League pennant. They became the first National League team to win a playoff series after being down 2–0. Garvey finished the series batting .400 with seven RBIs, and was named the NLCS Most Valuable Player for the second time in his career.

After returning from Chicago on a delayed flight, the team boarded buses from the airport, and was boosted by the surprising 2,000 fans waiting to greet them at the Jack Murphy Stadium parking lot at about 9:45 P.M. Gossage, a former New York Yankee, said the San Diego crowd at Game 3 was "the loudest crowd I've ever heard anywhere." Gwynn agreed as well. Jack Murphy Stadium played "Cub-Busters", a parody of the theme song from the 1984 movie Ghostbusters. Cub-Busters T-shirts inspired from the movie were popular attire for Padres fans.

 World series 

In the 1984 World Series, the Padres faced the powerful Detroit Tigers, who steamrolled through the regular season with 104 victories (and had started out with a 35–5 record, the best ever through the first 40 games). The Tigers were managed by Sparky Anderson and featured shortstop and native San Diegan Alan Trammell and outfielder Kirk Gibson, along with Lance Parrish and DH Darrell Evans. The pitching staff was bolstered by ace Jack Morris (19-11, 3.60 ERA), Dan Petry (18-8), Milt Wilcox (17-8), and closer Willie Hernández (9-3, 1.92 ERA with 32 saves). Jack Morris would win games 1 and 4 and the Tigers would go on to win the Series in five games.

San Diego's starting pitchers crumbled in the postseason with a combined ERA of 9.09, including 13.94 against Detroit, surpassing the Cubs mark of 9.50 in 1932 as the worst in the then-82-year history of the World Series. Show, Thurmond, Lollar, and Whitson combined to throw only  innings versus the Tigers while surrendering 25 hits, eight walks, and 16 earned runs. Only once did a starter pitch at least five innings. Whitson (NLCS Game 3) was the only starter to earn a win in the playoffs. Out of the bullpen, Lefferts was excellent in the postseason with 10 scoreless innings in six appearances, while Hawkins and Dravecky pitched well in the playoffs as well.

After a disappointing season for 37-year-old journeyman Kurt Bevacqua, he hit .412 in the World Series as the Padres designated hitter, hitting the game-winning home run in Game 2 as well as an eighth-inning homer in the finale, which had cut San Diego's deficit to 5–4. Playing in place of the injured McReynolds, Bobby Brown had the team's only two RBIs by Padres outfielders against the Tigers, but he batted just 1-for-15.

Reporter Barry Bloom of MLB.com wrote in 2011 that "the postseason in '84 is still the most exciting week of Major League Baseball ever played in San Diego." Gossage, who is mostly remembered as a Yankee, called it "special being a part of turning on a city for the first time, going to the World Series for the first time".

 Award winners 
 Tony Gwynn, National League Batting Champion (.351)
 Tony Gwynn, National League Leader in Hits (213)

1984 Major League Baseball All-Star Game
 Steve Garvey, first baseman (starter) – 9th selection
 Tony Gwynn, left field (starter) – 1st selection
 Goose Gossage, pitcher (reserve) – 8th selection

 Farm system 

 References 

 External links 
 1984 San Diego Padres team at Baseball-Reference 1984 San Diego Padres at Baseball Almanac''
 A look back at the '84 NL Champs

San Diego Padres seasons
San Diego Padres season
1984
1984
San Diego Padres